Early childhood development is the period of rapid physical, psychological and social growth and change that begins before birth and extends into early childhood. While early childhood is not well defined, one source asserts that the early years begin in utero and last until 3 years of age.

Milestones 
Developmental milestones represent useful markers that medical professionals and families can use to determine the developmental stage of a growing child. The following table contains examples of typical milestones achieved at each time point across al four domains:

Pediatric growth 
Pediatric growth is measured in height or length, head circumference (used from 0–2 years of age), weight, and BMI (used starting at 2 years of age).  It is determined by multiple factors including genetic, environmental, hormonal, nutritional and psychosocial factors. Some factors, such as maternal nutrition and alcohol, tobacco and drug exposure affect size at birth while other factors, such as genetic syndromes and family members heights have a later influence on size. In addition, different endocrine factors or hormones like growth hormone, insulin-like growth factors, thyroid hormones, glucocorticoids, and reproductive hormones contribute to normal growth.

Normal physical parameters and ranges 
Percentile growth charts, such as the figures created by the Centers for Disease Control and Prevention (CDC) shown on this page, are used to track growth by comparing children of similar age and sex.  The major percentile lines are the 95th, 90th, 75th, 50th, 25th, 10th, and 5th percentiles. The CDC growth reference charts define the normal range of growth as between the 5th and 95th percentiles.

While it is common for babies to shift percentiles during the first 2 years of life due to shifting from an intrauterine environment to one outside the uterus, shifting percentiles after 2 years of age may be the first sign of an underlying problem.  Babies experience the greatest height velocity, or speed of growth, during the first 2 years of life.  In addition, the mid parental height (MPH) is used to calculate the expected height potential and interpret the growth curve of a child.  The following calculations are used for males and females respectively:

Male = (father’s height + mother’s height + 13 cm)/2

Female = (father’s height-13 cm + mother’s height)/2.

Abnormal/delayed development 
Developmental delay occurs when children fail to develop milestones compared to their peers in the population. It is more of a descriptive term of a broad set of physical and psychosocial qualities than a diagnosis.

Growth delay 
Children should be evaluated for abnormal linear growth when their charted growth crosses at least 2 percentiles beyond first 2 years of life, being born small for gestational age without signs of catching up to normal size, or abnormal height velocity for a child’s age. In addition, if the child’s height is more or less than 2 standard deviations (SD) below the average height for the child’s age or 2 SD below the MPH, then they should be evaluated for short stature. The cause of short stature can be normal or pathological. Two normal causes of growth delay are familial or genetic short stature and constitutional growth delay.  Familial short stature is when the child's estimated final height is appropriate based on their MPH with shorter parental heights in less than 10th percentile. Constitutional growth delay is when the child's delayed puberty causes a delay in growth which will eventually catch up after puberty begins. Measuring the bone age of the child after 3 years of age can be used to distinguish a normal from a pathological cause. Pathological causes in early childhood tend to be malnutrition and failure to thrive which could happen while they were developing in utero or after birth.

Development delay 
Developmental delay is divided into Global Developmental Delay (GDD) and Intellectual Disability (ID). Global Developmental Delay is defined as a delay in two or more domains of development, while Intellectual Disability is defined as deficits in reasoning, adaptive functioning, or other intellectual aspects and typically becomes apparent later in life.

Both GDD and ID have a wide range of causes, and range from genetic mutations (Fragile X Disorder, Prader-Willi Disorder, etc.) to exposure to teratogens during gestation (Fetal Alcohol Syndrome). In many cases, the causes of GDD and ID in an individual can be the same.

References 

Child development